In mathematics, in the area of complex analysis, Nachbin's theorem (named after Leopoldo Nachbin) is commonly used to establish a bound on the growth rates for an analytic function. This article provides a brief review of growth rates, including the idea of a function of exponential type. Classification of growth rates based on type help provide a finer tool than big O or Landau notation, since a number of theorems about the analytic structure of the bounded function and its integral transforms can be stated. In particular, Nachbin's theorem may be used to give the domain of convergence of the generalized Borel transform, given below.

Exponential type

A function f(z) defined on the complex plane is said to be of exponential type if there exist constants M and α such that

Letting α stand for the infimum of all such α, one then says that the function f is of exponential type α.

For example, let . Then one says that  is of exponential type π, since π is the smallest number that bounds the growth of  along the imaginary axis. So, for this example, Carlson's theorem cannot apply, as it requires functions of exponential type less than π.

Ψ type
Bounding may be defined for other functions besides the exponential function. In general, a function  is a comparison function if it has a series

Comparison functions are necessarily entire, which follows from the ratio test. If  is such a comparison function, one then says that f is of Ψ-type if there exist constants M and τ such that

If τ is the infimum of all such τ one says that f is of Ψ-type τ.

Nachbin's theorem states that a function f(z) with the series

is of Ψ-type τ if and only if

Borel transform
Nachbin's theorem has immediate applications in Cauchy theorem-like situations, and for integral transforms.  For example, the generalized Borel transform is given by

Furthermore, one has

where the contour of integration γ encircles the disk .  This generalizes the usual Borel transform for exponential type, where .  The integral form for the generalized Borel transform follows as well. Let  be a function whose first derivative is bounded on the interval , so that

where . Then the integral form of the generalized Borel transform is

The ordinary Borel transform is regained by setting . Note that the integral form of the Borel transform is just the Laplace transform.

Nachbin resummation
Nachbin resummation (generalized Borel transform) can be used to sum divergent series that escape to the usual Borel summation or even to solve (asymptotically) integral equations of the form:

where f(t) may or may not be of exponential growth and the kernel K(u) has a Mellin transform. An example of this is the Gram series  

Fréchet space
Collections of functions of exponential type  can form a complete uniform space, namely a Fréchet space, by the topology induced by the countable family of norms

See also
 Divergent series
 Borel summation
 Euler summation
 Cesàro summation
 Lambert summation
 Mittag-Leffler summation
 Phragmén–Lindelöf principle
 Abelian and tauberian theorems
 Van Wijngaarden transformation

References
 L. Nachbin, "An extension of the notion of integral functions of the finite exponential type", Anais Acad. Brasil. Ciencias. 16 (1944) 143–147.
 Ralph P. Boas, Jr. and R. Creighton Buck, Polynomial Expansions of Analytic Functions (Second Printing Corrected), (1964) Academic Press Inc., Publishers New York, Springer-Verlag, Berlin. Library of Congress Card Number 63-23263. (Provides a statement and proof of Nachbin's theorem, as well as a general review of this topic.)
 
 

Integral transforms
Theorems in complex analysis
Summability methods